Oslob, officially the Municipality of Oslob,  is a 4th class municipality in the province of Cebu, Philippines. According to the 2020 census, it has a population of 29,264 people.

Oslob is bordered to the north by the town of Boljoon, to the west are the towns of Ginatilan And Samboan, to the east is the Cebu Strait, and to the south is the town of Santander.

Geography

Topography
Generally, topography of the area is hilly and rolling, dominated by open grasslands and second growth forest. There are fairly level and rolling plateaus and valleys spread throughout the interior. These are some of the most suitable areas for upland agriculture.

Soil Type
Faraon clay steep phase; Medellin clay Lugo clay

Land Classification

Climate

The municipality of Oslob belongs to Coronas climate type III with a dry season from February to September and the wet season from October.

Barangays 

Oslob comprises 21 barangays:

Demographics

Economy

Public Markets: 2

Toslob Festival

The official festival of Oslob is the annual Toslob Festival which coincides with the feast of the Immaculate Concepcion in December.

The official was originally named Sadsad Festival (which started as a barangay festival of Poblacion) and then was renamed to Sadsadayon Festival, but was changed again to Toslob Festival.

Tourist attractions

Baluarte

The Baluarte (Spanish for watchtower) of Oslob was built in 1788. Its main purpose was to provide a safe place wherein guards could observe the surrounding area. It was a part of the defense system in dispelling the Moro raiders of the past, which included 6 other watchtowers along the coastline of Oslob. Just near the cuartel, are the ruins of an ancient watchtower. So effective was this system that in 1815, the townspeople of Oslob were able to repel one such attack and remain at peace ever since. This prompted them to relocate the town to its present site from their fortified settlement in Daanglungsod,  which is now in ruins but still breathtaking.

Church of the Immaculate Conception

Oslob was established as a visita of Boljoon in 1690 and became an independent parish in 1848 with the Immaculate Conception as its patroness. The present-day church of cut coral stone was started in 1830 and finished 18 years later. The buttresses that were added between 1848 and 1850. The adjacent bell tower was built in 1858. The church was burned down during the Second World War liberating Philippine Commonwealth troops and Cebuano guerillas against the Japanese in Oslob in 1945, and 1955 but was eventually restored.

Outside the walls are the remains of a watchtower, one of the many that line the southeastern coast of the Cebu.

The church is connected to the parish house or convento that still has its original clay-tiled roof. Across the road from the church is the former mortuary chapel with a pediment decorated with a relief of a human skeleton. North of the complex is a small road that leads to the old cemetery.

In 2008, a fire gutted the 19th-century church's interior, including the altar and adjacent rectory, but it spared the image of Our Lady of Immaculate Conception, which is inside a glass case, and the 73 other icons near the door to the bell tower.

Cuartel

Located front right of the church of Oslob, just outside the perimeter stone fence and near the sea, at the intersection of Calle Aeternidad and the end of Calle Aragones, stands an unfinished building made of coral blocks resembling a Spanish-era barracks. This was intended to be the cuartel, barracks for Spanish soldiers or guardia civil. It was started about 1860, but remained unfinished at the end of Spanish occupation in 1898.

Sumilon Island

Sumilon Island is a  coral island off the coast of Bancogon, Oslob, Cebu. The island hosts the Sumilon Bluewater Island Resort which developed the island into an eco-friendly haven for those who want to get away from the stress of city living.

The island of Sumilon is located in the southeastern tip of Oslob. It is the first marine protected area in the Philippines; created as a marine sanctuary in 1974 under the guidance of the Silliman University Marine Reserve of Dumaguete in the nearby province of Negros Oriental.

The island is famous throughout the country and internationally for the exceptional beauty of its dive sites. Sumilon has four major dive sites, which are Garden Eel Plaza, Nikki's Wall, Coral Landscape and Julie's Rock. The island's diving sites are famous for their superb visibility, stunning reefs and abundance of varied tropical marine species that provide an ideal and memorable dive. There are occasional sightings of black tip sharks during dives. A popular attraction in Sumilon Island is its sandbar because of its changing shapes and shifting locations around the island depending on the season. Other places of interest in the island are a natural lagoon with high mangroves and natural caves used by fishermen to seek refuge during storms, and a lake. On the south portion of the island, a lighthouse rests on a protected tree park and beside it is a "baluarte", a historical watchtower built as part of a warning system to thwart slavers and marauders in the 19th century.

Besides diving, there is also bird-watching, picnicking, fishing, hiking, island tours, paddling and trekking. It is also close to Dumaguete in the nearby island province of Negros Oriental.

From the port of Oslob, there are various boats to the island. Another route to Sumilon Island is via Dumaguete since it is also close to the island.

Whale shark watching

It has become a popular tourist attraction. Local fishermen feed the whale sharks by hand which tourists find entertaining.

In the vicinity of whale shark swimming is a recent attraction: Tumalog Falls. Most tourists and visitors who go whale shark swimming in Tanawan usually include this waterfall in their itinerary.

Tumalog Falls
Tumalog Falls, also called as "Toslob falls" or "Mag-ambak falls", is situated in barangay Luka.  It takes approximately three and a half hours to get to the area from Cebu City.

Transportation

 National Road: 
 Provincial Road: 
 Municipal Road : 
 Barangay Road :

Education

Schools (public & private):
 Elementary: 13
 High Schools:6
 College: 1

References

Sources

External links

 [ Philippine Standard Geographic Code]

Municipalities of Cebu